is a railway station on the Keiō Line in Setagaya, Tokyo, operated by the private railway operator Keio Corporation.

Station layout

Platforms

History
Kami-Kitazawa Station opened on 15 April 1913.

References

Railway stations in Japan opened in 1913
Keio Line
Stations of Keio Corporation
Railway stations in Tokyo